Marius Copil was the defending champion but lost the final to Jürgen Zopp, 7–6(7–4), 7–6(7–4).

Seeds

Draw

Finals

Top half

Bottom half

References
 Main Draw
 Qualifying Draw

Kazan Kremlin Cup - Singles
2012 Singles
2012 in Russian tennis